Moreno Merenda (born 17 May 1978) is a former Swiss footballer and the current assistant manager of SC Cham.

Career
Merenda was born in Baar, and began his football career at home town club FC Baar. He made the transition to professional football in 1995, moving to the Swiss team FC Luzern. After signing for Liechtenstein-based FC Vaduz in 2001, Merenda enjoyed two personally successful seasons, where he managed to earn the interest of his next club FC St. Gallen. Although unable to secure a regular place in the lineup, he regularly scored for his side. He was thus held in high regard by fans and the press.

Being unhappy with the personal situation in St. Gallen, the club made the striker available for loan in December 2005.

On 1 January 2006, Merenda joined FC Schaffhausen on loan until 30 June 2006.

On 1 August 2006 Merenda was released from FC St. Gallen and rejoined his former club Neuchâtel Xamax on a free transfer.

The 2006–2007 season saw Merenda on top form again as he hit 22 goals in 34 appearances upon returning to his former club Neuchâtel Xamax, helping them earn promotion to the Swiss Super League. Having made 65 appearances for Xamax over two seasons, he rejoined his former club St. Gallen for the 2008–2009 season.

On 1 July 2015 Merenda decided not to renew his contract with SC Cham and retired from football, starting his coaching career as assistant manager of the team.

International life
In his youth, Merenda also won Swiss U-21 honours.

References

External links
Football.ch profile

1978 births
Living people
Swiss men's footballers
Switzerland under-21 international footballers
Swiss expatriates in Liechtenstein
Swiss Super League players
Swiss Challenge League players
Swiss people of Italian descent
FC St. Gallen players
FC Vaduz players
Swiss expatriate footballers
Swiss expatriate sportspeople in Liechtenstein
Neuchâtel Xamax FCS players
FC Luzern players
FC Locarno players
BSC Young Boys players
FC Wohlen players
FC Baden players
FC Schaffhausen players
SC Cham players
Expatriate footballers in Liechtenstein
Association football forwards
People from Baar, Switzerland
Sportspeople from the canton of Zug